Gwynedd Hall is an historic home which is located in Lower Gwynedd Township, Montgomery County, Pennsylvania.

It was added to the National Register of Historic Places in 1985.

History and architectural features
Built in 1824, it was rebuilt into its present configuration in 1852. It is a two- to three-story, stuccoed stone and frame country dwelling, which was designed in the Greek Revival style.

The five-bay symmetrical front facade features a pedimented portico with Doric order columns. The house also has open porches with decorative wrought iron railings, balustrades, and cornices.

It was added to the National Register of Historic Places in 1985.

References

Houses on the National Register of Historic Places in Pennsylvania
Greek Revival houses in Pennsylvania
Houses completed in 1852
Houses in Montgomery County, Pennsylvania
National Register of Historic Places in Montgomery County, Pennsylvania
1852 establishments in Pennsylvania